George Henry Sherwood (1878 – 10 October 1935) was a British Labour Party politician.

The son of a miner, Sherwood became a railway employee, and was Mayor of Wakefield.

He was elected at the 1923 general election as the Member of Parliament for Wakefield, but defeated in 1924. He regained the seat in 1929, but was defeated again in 1931.

References

External links 
 

1878 births
1935 deaths
Labour Party (UK) MPs for English constituencies
National Union of Railwaymen-sponsored MPs
UK MPs 1923–1924
UK MPs 1929–1931
Mayors of places in Yorkshire and the Humber
Politicians from Wakefield